Minuartia stolonifera is a rare species of flowering plant in the pink family known by the common names Scott Mountain sandwort and stolon sandwort.

It is endemic to Siskiyou County, California, where it is known from only two occurrences in the Scott Mountains of the Klamath Range.

It is a member of the serpentine soils flora in the area, growing amidst Jeffrey Pines with other rare local plants such as the Mt. Eddy lupine (Lupinus lapidicola).

Description
Minuartia stolonifera is a stoloniferous perennial herb forming a low mat of hairless herbage 10 to 20 centimeters high with thin, erect flowering stems. The tiny rigid needle-like leaves are under a centimeter long and a millimeter wide.

The hairy, glandular inflorescence bears flowers with five white petals each under a centimeter long.

References

External links
Jepson Manual Treatment
USDA Plants Profile
Flora of North America
Photo gallery

stolonifera
Endemic flora of California
Flora of the Klamath Mountains
Natural history of Siskiyou County, California
Plants described in 1991
Critically endangered flora of California